Edişə (also, Edisha and Yedysha) is a village and municipality in the Jalilabad Rayon of Azerbaijan.  It has a population of 710.

References 

Populated places in Jalilabad District (Azerbaijan)